The Hague Institute for Global Justice, or simply The Hague Institute, is an international think tank based in The Hague, Netherlands. It was established in 2011 by a consortium of partners including the Municipality of The Hague, an academic coalition of Hague-based organizations and with support from the Dutch government. Its current president is Jordanian businesswoman Sohair Salam Saber.

According to the institute, it "aims to contribute to, and further strengthen, the global framework for preventing and resolving conflict and promoting international peace."

History 
The Hague Institute was supported by an Advisory Council who served as a "strategic sounding board" for the president of the institute. Former U.S. Secretary of State Madeleine Albright served as chair of the Advisory Council.

In late spring 2012, former Dutch State Secretary for European Affairs and International Cooperation Ben Knapen launched Knowledge Platform Security & Rule of Law, which consisted of a network of experts and practitioners, and focused on building "security and rule of law" in developing countries. The Hague Institute served as the primary facilitator for the platform's partners, including the Ministry of Foreign Affairs of the Netherlands.

In June 2014, the institute, in cooperation with the United States Holocaust Memorial Museum in Washington, D.C., and the National Security Archive at George Washington University, convened 35 officials and eyewitnesses for a multi-day conference on the Rwanda Genocide. The event was based on the "critical oral history" approach. Participants included Ibrahim Gambari, Henry Kwami Anyidoho, Lord David Hannay, Prudence Bushnell, Michael N. Barnett and Lieutenant-General Roméo Dallaire.

Professor Nico Schrijver, academic director of the Grotius Centre for International Legal Studies at Leiden University, served as the institute's first dean between January and August 2011. Professor Willem van Genugten,   served as interim dean of the institute from September 2011 to December 2012. He was succeeded as the Institutes's first president,   Abiodun Williams , the former senior vice president of the Center for Conflict Management at the United States Institute of Peace (USIP) in Washington, D.C. on January 1, 2013.     In an article by Dutch magazine De Groene Amsterdammer published on 4 April 2018, sources told the magazine that Williams insisted that the position of "international dean" had to be restyled as "president", in addition to a very high financial compensation package in order to lend him greater authority and benefits. The Dutch government granted up to €20 million in subsidies for the institute.

According to a reconstruction by Dutch newspaper De Volkskrant, Williams spent thousands of euros on expensive lunches at the nearby Carlton Ambassador hotel and first-class flights since "cattle class" was not good enough for him. A senior researcher quoted in the article indicates that there were many clashes between employees and Williams, who distanced himself from staff whenever he felt challenged: "[It was] as if it was beneath his dignity to talk to me directly. There was a culture clash. We academics are egalitarian, but he was very focused on hierarchy and quickly felt criticized."

The topic was raised in the Dutch parliament, where several political parties posed questions to the Dutch Minister of Economic Affairs and Climate, Eric Wiebes. Willem Moorlag from the Dutch socialist party PvdA asked the minister whether there was any judicial ground to recover the lost funds from Williams and the supervisory board. The right-wing Forum voor Democratie (FvD) asked the minister why no action was undertaken against Williams when it was already clear after several months that he didn't fulfill his role as fundraiser. Jan Paternotte from the social liberal D66 asked the minister how it was possible that the Institute still received subsidies after a critical report by Price Waterhouse Coopers exposed the financial mismanagement.

Bankruptcy and revival
In April 2018, The Hague Institute for Global Justice closed down after becoming insolvent. The institute was declared bankrupt in May 2018.

In July 2018, following talks between the Institute and Sohair Salam Saber, a Jordanian businesswoman and philanthropist, a declaration of intent to continue the legacy of The institute was announced. In September 2018, Saber purchased the institute.

On 29 January 2019, at Nieuwspoort at the Dutch parliamentary building, Saber was announced as the institute's second president, with previous experience working with various governments worldwide on issues such as public policy, innovation and development. During the event, lawyer Mahmoud Abuwasel was also announced as vice president of the institute.In January 2019, Sohair Salam Saber was announced as the second president of the institute, with Mahmoud Abuwasel named as vice president.

References

External links
 

Organizations established in 2011
Social sciences organizations
Organisations based in The Hague
Legal research institutes
Research institutes in the Netherlands
2011 establishments in the Netherlands
Research institutes established in 2011
Think tanks established in 2011